Adam Humphries (born June 24, 1993) is an American football wide receiver who is a free agent. He played college football at Clemson and signed as an undrafted free agent with the Tampa Bay Buccaneers in 2015. He has also been a member of the Tennessee Titans and Washington Football Team.

Early life
Humphries was born in Spartanburg, South Carolina on June 24, 1993. He attended Dorman High School in Roebuck, South Carolina and played varsity football and basketball for the Cavaliers.

College career
Humphries played 53 games and started 27 of them for Clemson from 2011 to 2014. Through his college career, he had a total of 127 receptions for 1,097 yards (8.6 avg.) and three touchdowns, as well as 10 carries for 24 yards and one touchdown and 69 punt returns for 476 yards (6.9 avg.) and one touchdown.

College statistics

Professional career
Coming out of Clemson, Humphries was projected by the majority of analysts to go undrafted and to be signed as an undrafted free agent. He was not invited to the NFL Scouting Combine but attended Clemson's Pro Day.

Tampa Bay Buccaneers

2015 season
Humphries went undrafted in the 2015 NFL Draft, but accepted an invitation to attend rookie minicamp with the Tampa Bay Buccaneers.

On May 11, 2015, the Tampa Bay Buccaneers signed Humphries to a three-year, $1.57 million contract that includes a signing bonus of $19,800. He entered training camp competing to be the Buccaneers' fifth wide receiver on their depth chart with Robert Herron, Donteea Dye, Rannell Hall, Tavarres King, and Kaelin Clay. On September 6, 2015, it was announced that Humphries had made the 53-man roster and would be a punt/kick returner and the Buccaneer's fifth wide receiver behind veterans Vincent Jackson, Mike Evans, Louis Murphy, and Russell Shepard.

Humphries made his NFL debut in the Buccaneers' season opener against the Tennessee Titans and finished the loss with two receptions for 14 yards. On October 5, 2015, the  Buccaneers waived Humphries and consequently signed him to their practice squad on October 7, 2015. After injuries to Buccaneer wide receivers Vincent Jackson and Russell Shepard, it was announced on October 28, 2015, that Humphries and Donteea Dye had been added to the active roster. On December 13, 2015, Humphries caught his first career touchdown reception on a six-yard pass from Jameis Winston, during a 17–24 loss to the New Orleans Saints. On December 17, 2015, he caught a season-high six passes for 60 receiving yards in a 23–31 loss to the St. Louis Rams.

Humphries finished his rookie year with 13 game appearances, 27 receptions for 260 yards and a receiving touchdown.

2016 season
Humphries entered training camp competing with Russell Shepard and Kenny Bell to be the Buccaneers' third wide receiver under new head coach Dirk Koetter. On August 1, 2016, head coach Dirk Koetter named Humphries the team's third receiver.

Humphries earned his first NFL start in the Buccaneers' season opener against the Atlanta Falcons and finished the 31–24 victory with three catches for 34 yards and one carry for seven yards. On September 25, 2016, Humphries caught a season-high nine passes for 100  yards in a 32–37 loss to the Los Angeles Rams. It was the first game with over 100 receiving yards of his career. During a Week 9 matchup against the Falcons, he caught five receptions for 46 yards and his first touchdown of the season on a seven-yard pass from Jameis Winston during a 28–43 loss. On December 18, 2016, Humphries caught a season-long 42 yard touchdown reception against the Dallas Cowboys. In Week 17, against the Carolina Panthers, Humphries had a career-high 10 receptions for 94 yards.

Humphries finished his second year with 15 game and four starts and 55 receptions for 622 yards and three touchdowns.

2017 season
On February 27, 2017, Humphries signed a one-year guaranteed contract tender with the Buccaneers worth $615,000.

Humphries entered the season third on the wide receiver depth chart behind Mike Evans and DeSean Jackson.

Humphries finished the season with a career-high 61 receptions for 631 yards and a touchdown.

2018 season
On March 12, 2018, the Buccaneers placed a second-round restricted free agent tender on Humphries.

In a Week 9 loss against the Carolina Panthers, Humphries caught eight passes for 82 yards and a career-high two touchdowns. In a Week 11 loss to the New York Giants, Humphries had three catches for 60 yards and a touchdown. 

Humphries finished 2018 with career highs in receptions, receiving yards, and touchdowns, recording 76 receptions for 816 yards and five touchdowns.

Tennessee Titans

2019 season

On March 14, 2019, Humphries signed a four-year, $36 million contract with the Tennessee Titans.

During a Week 10 35–32 victory against the Kansas City Chiefs, Humphries caught his first touchdown of the season on a 23-yard reception from Ryan Tannehill, which proved to be the game-winner. In the next game against the Indianapolis Colts, Humphries caught his second touchdown of the season on a 13-yard reception in the 31–17 road victory. Overall, Humphries finished the 2019 season with 37 receptions for 374 receiving yards and two receiving touchdowns.

2020 season
On October 2, 2020, Humphries was placed on the reserve/COVID-19 list by the team. He was activated on October 14. He was placed on injured reserve on December 8, 2020. Humphries was released by the Titans following the season. He finished the 2020 season with 23 receptions for 228 receiving yards and two receiving touchdowns.

Washington Football Team
Humphries signed with the Washington Football Team on March 25, 2021. In the 2021 season, Humphries finished with 41 receptions for 383 receiving yards.

The San Francisco 49ers hosted Humphries for a workout on October 31, 2022. He also worked out for the New York Giants on November 28, 2022. The Giants hosted Humphries again for another workout on January 10, 2023.

NFL career statistics

References

External links

Clemson Tigers bio

1993 births
Living people
American football wide receivers
Clemson Tigers football players
Players of American football from South Carolina
Sportspeople from Spartanburg, South Carolina
Tampa Bay Buccaneers players
Tennessee Titans players
Washington Football Team players